The following list includes notable people who were born or have lived in Passaic, New Jersey. For a similar list organized alphabetically by last name, see the category page People from Passaic, New Jersey.

 Rita Deanin Abbey (1930–2021), multidisciplinary abstract artist who was among the first art professors at the University of Nevada, Las Vegas
 Mitch Albom (born 1958), sports journalist and author of Tuesdays With Morrie
 Brant Alyea (born 1940), former MLB outfielder, who played with four different teams from 1965 to 1972,  and is one of nine players to hit a home run on his first MLB pitch
 Ronnie Ash (born 1988), track and field athlete specializing in hurdles who was selected as part of the U.S. team at the 2016 Summer Olympics
 John Barbata (born 1945), drummer for The Turtles
 William J. Bate (1934–2011), politician who served as a state senator, assemblyman, and judge
 Joan Berger (1933–2021), former infielder and outfielder who played from 1951 through 1954 in the All-American Girls Professional Baseball League
 Peg Blitch (1934–2021), politician who served in the Georgia House of Representatives and Georgia State Senate
 Ernest Blood (1872–1955), high school and college men's basketball coach who was best known for his "Wonder Teams" at Passaic High School, which lost only one game in the span of a decade and set an American high school record for most consecutive victories
 Warren Bogle (born 1946), former Major League Baseball pitcher who appeared in 16 games played for the Oakland Athletics during the 1968 season
 Terrence Boyle (born 1945), judge on the United States District Court for the Eastern District of North Carolina
 George Breeman (1880–1937), sailor and Medal of Honor recipient
 Herbert Brucker (1898–1977), journalist, teacher, and national advocate for the freedom of the press, who served as editor-in-chief of the Hartford Courant
 Bob Butterworth (born 1942), former Florida Attorney General
 Jim Castiglia (1918–2007), football fullback who played in the National Football League for the Washington Redskins and Philadelphia Eagles
 Arthur K. Cebrowski (1942–2005), United States Navy admiral and senior U.S. Department of Defense official
 Morris Cerullo (1931–2020), Pentecostal televangelist
 Robert L. Clifford (1924–2014), associate justice of the New Jersey Supreme Court
 Alan N. Cohen (1930–2004), former co-owner of the Boston Celtics and the New Jersey Nets
 T. Zachary Cotler (born 1981), poet and novelist
 Howard Crook (born 1947), opera singer, tenor
 Edwin Decena, music video and independent film director
 Mark DeRosa (born 1975), Major League Baseball infielder
 Beatie Deutsch (née Rabin; born 1989), ultra-Orthodox Jewish American-Israeli marathon runner
 Joel Diamond, record producer
 Paul DiGaetano (born 1953), politician who served in the New Jersey General Assembly representing the 36th Legislative District from 1992 to 2006 and again from 1986 to 1987
 Dow H. Drukker (1872–1963), represented New Jersey's 6th congressional district from 1914 to 1919
 Evelyn Dubrow (1911–2006), lobbyist and Presidential Medal of Freedom recipient
 Peter Enns (born 1961), Bible scholar
 Charles Evered (born 1964), playwright
 Donald Fagen (born 1948), musician and co-founder of Steely Dan
 George Feifer (1934–2019), journalist, novelist, and historian, known for his autobiographical novels chronicling life in the Soviet Union
 Amod Field (born 1967), former wide receiver who played for the Phoenix Cardinals of the National Football League
 Jack Fina (1913–1970), pianist and orchestra leader known as "The ten most talented fingers on radio"
 Dorothy Fuldheim (1893–1989), journalist and anchor best known for her work for The Cleveland Press and WEWS-TV
 Joel Gersmann (1942–2005), experimental theatre playwright
 Ralph Giacomarro (born 1961), former American football punter who played in the NFL for the Atlanta Falcons and Denver Broncos
 Paul Goldberger (born 1950), Pulitzer Prize-winning architecture critic
 Rafe Gomez (born ), business writer, sales support consultant, lecturer, music producer and DJ
 Thaddeus Gromada (born 1929), Polish-American historian
 Hezekiah Griggs (born 1988), entrepreneur, philanthropist, and investor who became the youngest African-American venture capitalist when he founded H360 Capital in 2011
 David Grisman (born 1945), bluegrass musician and former member of Old & In the Way with Jerry Garcia of the Grateful Dead
 Reed Gusciora (born 1960), former minority leader of the New Jersey General Assembly
 Beth Gylys (born 1964), poet and professor<ref>Walsh, William J. (editor) [https://books.google.com/books?id=iiG_MOtag50C&q=Beth+Gylys%27%27Under&pg=PA145 the Rock Umbrella: Contemporary American Poets, 1951–1977], p. 145. Mercer University Press, 2006. . Accessed January 3, 2015 "Beth Gylys (b. 1964, Passaic, New Jersey) is currently an associate professor at Georgia State University."</ref>
 Steve Hamas (1907–1974), professional football player in the National Football League who turned to professional boxing, defeating former heavyweight champions Tommy Loughran and Max Schmelling
 Art Harris (1949–1970), running back who was involved in the 1970 Marshall football team plane crash that killed everyone on board
 Andrew R. Heinze (born 1955), playwright, non-fiction author, and scholar of American history
 Robert Helps (1928–2001), pianist and composer
 Craig Heyward (1966–2006), National Football League running back
 David Hirsch (born 1969), rabbi and rosh yeshiva at the Rabbi Isaac Elchanan Theological Seminary of Yeshiva University
 Dennis Johnson (born 1951), former NFL defensive tackle
 Gianfranco Iannotta (born 1994), track and field athlete who won a gold medal at the 2016 Summer Paralympics
 Mike Jorgensen (born 1948), former Major League Baseball player
 Lewis Kaplan (born 1933), violinist
 Ilona Murai Kerman (1923/1924–2020), dancer
 Keith Kidwell (born 1961), member of the North Carolina House of Representatives since 2019, where he has represented the 79th district
 Fritz Knothe (1903–1963), former Major League Baseball player and member of "Wonder Team"
 Barbara L'Italien (born 1961), politician who served in the Massachusetts House of Representatives from 2003 to 2011
 Paul J. Lioy (1947–2015), specialist in the field of environmental health and specializing in exposure science who analyzed the effects of dust in the wake of the collapse of the World Trade Center after the September 11, 2001, terrorist attacks
 Alex Lovy (1913–1992), animator and director who spent the majority of his career at Walter Lantz Productions
 Fred R. Low (1860–1936), mechanical engineer, long-time editor of the journal Power, and an international figure in journalism and engineering who served as mayor of Passaic in 1908–1909
 Ray Malavasi (1930–1987), former National Football League head coach
 William J. Martini (born 1947), former Republican Congressman
 Joe McHale (born 1963), former American football linebacker who played in the NFL for the New England Patriots
 Mary Meriam (born 1955), poet and editor, who is a founding editor of Headmistress Press, one of the few presses in the United States specializing in lesbian poetry
 Da'Mon Merkerson (born 1989), football cornerback who is a two-time Arena Football League ArenaBowl winner with the Arizona Rattlers
 Larry Mialik (born 1950), former National Football League player
 Nick Mike-Mayer (born 1950), football placekicker who played in the NFL for the Atlanta Falcons, Philadelphia Eagles and the Buffalo Bills
 Ron Mikolajczyk (born 1950), retired professional American football offensive lineman and retired professional wrestler, who played in the NFL for the New York Giants
 Bill Mokray (1907–1974), basketball historian and statistician enshrined in the Basketball Hall of Fame in 1965 as a contributor to the sport
 Jack Mulhall (1887–1979), silent film and talkie actor
 Lester Novros (1909–2000), artist, animator and teacher
 Arthur Melvin Okun (1928–1980), economist who served as chairman of the Council of Economic Advisers between 1968 and 1969
 Emil Olszowy (1921–1980), politician who served for four years in the New Jersey General Assembly where he represented the 34th Legislative District
 Tom Papa (born 1968), comedian, actor, writer and television/radio host
 Morris Pashman (1912–1999), New Jersey Supreme Court Justice, mayor of Passaic from 1951 to 1955
 Millie Perkins (born 1938), actress, best known for her lead role in the film The Diary of Anne Frank Jason Perry (born 1976),  former safety in the NFL from 1999 to 2002
 Eleanore Pettersen (1916–2003), one of the first female architects in New Jersey
 Joe Piscopo (born 1951), comedian and actor
 Gerry Polci, drummer and singer with Frankie Valli and The Four Seasons
 Michael J. Pollard (1939–2019), actor, Academy Award nominee for film Bonnie and Clyde Gerald J. Popek (1946–2008), computer scientist, known for his research on operating systems and virtualization
 Stuart Rabner (born 1960), Chief Justice of the New Jersey Supreme Court
 Pamela Radcliff (born 1956), historian and professor at the University of California at San Diego and an authority on the history of modern Spain
 Elroy Schwartz (1923–2013), television screenwriter
 Sherwood Schwartz (1916–2011), TV producer, best known for creating Gilligan's Island and The Brady Bunch William Winfield Scott (1855–1935), lawyer who served as Passaic's official historian
 James P. Shenton (1925–2003), historian of nineteenth-and twentieth-century America and professor at Columbia University
 The Shirelles, musicians
 Rich Skrosky (born 1964), football coach
 Robert Smithson (1938–1973), artist best known for  Spiral Jetty Wrote about his home city in "The Monuments of Passaic."
 Edith E. Sproul (1907–1999), pathologist whose work with Dr. Georgios Papanikolaou led to the development of the pap smear test for cervical cancer
 Mark Stevens (born 1962), former professional football quarterback who played in the CFL for the Montreal Concordes / Alouettes and the NFL for the San Francisco 49ers
 Thomas Stockham (1933–2004), scientist who developed one of the first practical digital audio recording systems, and pioneered techniques for digital audio recording and processing
 Tyronne Stowe (born 1965), former NFL linebacker
 Marcia Strassman (1948–2014), actress best known for her role in the television series Welcome Back, Kotter Loretta Swit (born 1937), actress, best known for her role in the television series M*A*S*H Danny Szetela (born 1987), Major League Soccer player
 Dave Szott (born 1967), National Football League player and coach
 Jack Tatum (1948–2010), safety who played ten seasons in the NFL for the Oakland Raiders and Houston Oilers
 Ösel Tendzin (1943–1990), Tibetan Buddhist scholarRegent, Ösel Tendzin , Shambhala.org. Accessed August 28, 2011. "Born in Passaic, New Jersey, in 1943, Thomas F. Rich attended Fordham University, graduating in 1965."
 Alvin Tresselt (1916–2000), author of children's books and editor of Humpty Dumpty magazine
 Paul L. Troast (1894–1972), building contractor, chairman of the New Jersey Turnpike Authority during its construction, and one-time failed gubernatorial candidate in 1953
 Rahshon Turner (born 1975), former professional basketball player
 Franklin Stuart Van Antwerpen (1941–2016), judge on the United States Court of Appeals for the Third Circuit
 Dick Vitale (born 1939), basketball coach and television sportscaster
 Liza Weil (born 1977), actress best known for roles in Gilmore Girls and How to Get Away with Murder''
 Perry Williams (born 1961), former cornerback for the New York Giants
 Darrin Winston (1966–2008), Major League Baseball player who played two seasons for the Philadelphia Phillies
 Saul Zaentz (1921–2014), film producer
 Frankie Zak (1922–1972), Major League Baseball player who played for the Pittsburgh Pirates

References

 

Passaic
Passaic